Cevdet Caner (born July 29, 1973 in St. Pölten, Lower Austria) is an Austrian entrepreneur of Kurdish origin from Turkey who made his career and  fortune in the property market. He also founded the largest independent customer-care firm in Austria, which is on the Vienna Stock Exchange

References

External links
Official Website

1973 births
Living people
Austrian people of Turkish descent
Austrian businesspeople